Hermann Nicolai (born 11 July 1952 in Friedberg) is a German theoretical physicist and director emeritus at the Max Planck Institute for Gravitational Physics in Potsdam-Golm.

Education and career
At Karlsruhe Institute of Technology, Hermann Nicolai, beginning in 1971, studied physics and mathematics with a Diplom in 1975 with a doctorate in 1978 under the supervision of Julius Wess. At Heidelberg University, Nicolai was from 1978 to 1979 an assistant in theoretical physics. From 1979 to 1986 he worked at CERN in Geneva as a staff member in the theory department. In 1983 he received his habilitation at Heidelberg University. He was from 1986 to 1988	a professor (with civil service grade C3) of theoretical physics at Karlsruhe Institute of Technology and from 1988 to 1997 a professor (with civil service grade C4) of theoretical physics at the University of Hamburg. At the Max Planck Institute for Gravitational Physics, Nicolai was head of the department "Quantum Gravity and Unified Field Theories" and a director from 1997 to 2020, when he retired as director emeritus.

He was from 1993 to 1995 a member of the editorial board of Communications in Mathematical Physics. He was from 1998 to 2003 the editor-in-chief of the IOP Publishing journal Classical and Quantum Gravity and is since 2006	th editor-in-chief of the journal General Relativity and Gravitation.

Nicolai received in 1991 the Otto-Klung-Award (now called the Klung Wilhelmy Science Award), in 2010 the Albert Einstein Medal, and in 2013 the Gay-Lussac-Humboldt Prize. He was appointed an honorary professor at the Humboldt University of Berlin and in 2005 at the University of Hannover.

Research
In the mid 1980s, Nicolai and Bernard de Wit developed the "N = 8 supergravity theory", which arises from the dimensional reduction of the maximally supersymmetrical d = 11 supergravity to four space-time dimensions (d = 4) and for which, from many plausible viewpoints, a maximal supersymmetry has a supergravity theory with a graviton and no particle with a spin greater than 2.

In the 2000s, Nicolai and colleagues investigated the behavior of gravitational equations close to a gravitational singularity such as the Big Bang; these investigation lead to models with chaotic dynamical billiards, in the case of classical general relativity theory in three dimensions. In the case of eleven-dimensional supergravity, these investigations to ten-dimensional "cosmological billiards", and the infinite-dimensional hyperbolic Kac Moody algebra appears as a symmetry.  contains the largest finite-dimensional exceptional semi-simple complex Lie algebra , which has been studied as a candidate for a grand unified theory (GUT]. Nicolai proposed a purely algebraic description of the universe in cosmological space-time regions near the singularity (within the Planck time) using the -symmetry, whereby the space-time dimensions result as an emergent phenomenon.

He and de Wit also constructed maximally gauged (N = 16) supergravity theories in three dimensions and their symmetries. Furthermore, Nicolai and colleagues examined generalizations of the variables of loop quantum gravity to supergravity / string theory.

Selected publications
In addition to the publications cited in the footnotes:
 
 
 
  (over 950 citation)
 
  arXiv.org
  arXiv.org
  arXiv.org
  arXiv.org
 
 
 
 
 
  Quantum gravity - the view from particle physics, Prag 2013, arXiv.org

External links
 Max Planck Institute for Gravitational Physics (homepage)

References

20th-century German physicists
21st-century German physicists
Theoretical physicists
Karlsruhe Institute of Technology alumni
People associated with CERN
Academic staff of the University of Hamburg
1952 births
Living people
Max Planck Institute directors